Jerald Raymond is an American rancher and politician from Idaho. Raymond is a Republican member of Idaho House of Representatives for District 35, seat A.

Early life 
Raymond was born in Rigby, Idaho. Raymond graduated from Rigby High School.

Education 
Raymond attended Ricks College.

Career 
Raymond is a rancher and cattle breeder in Idaho.

Raymond is an U.S. Department of the Interior appointee to the BLM Resource Advisory Council.

Raymond is a former commissioner for Jefferson County, Idaho.

On November 6, 2018, Raymond won the election unopposed and became a Republican member of Idaho House of Representatives for District 35, seat A.

Personal life 
Raymond's wife is Cheri Raymond. They have six children. Raymond and his family live in Menan, Idaho.

References

External links 
 Jerald Raymond at ballotpedia.org
 Representative Jerald  Raymond at legislature.idaho.gov

Living people
Republican Party members of the Idaho House of Representatives
People from Rigby, Idaho
Year of birth missing (living people)
21st-century American politicians